The Armed Forces of Mauritania is the defence force of the Islamic Republic of Mauritania, having an army, navy, air force, gendarmerie, and presidential guard. Other services include the national guard and national police, though they both are subordinated to the Ministry of the Interior. As of 2018, the Mauritanian armed forces budget was 3.9% of the country's GDP.

The military forces of Mauritania are listed by the IISS Military Balance 2007 as comprising 15,870 personnel with an additional 5,000 paramilitaries, in the national gendarmerie. The Navy (Marine Mauritanienne) has 620 personnel and 11 patrol and coastal combatants, with bases at Nouadhibou and Nouakchott. The CIA reports that the navy includes naval infantry. The small Air Force (Force Aerienne Islamique de Mauritanie, FAIM) has 250 personnel, 2 FTB-337 aircraft, 15 transport aircraft of various types, and 4 SF-260E trainers. The 5,000 paramilitaries are divided in the National Gendarmerie (3,000), and the National Guard (2,000) who both report to the Ministry of the Interior. Other paramilitary services reported by the CIA in 2001 include the National Police, Presidential Guard (BASEP).

History

Saleh Ould Hanenna, a former army major, led the 2003 Mauritanian coup d'état attempt in June 2003. It aimed to overthrow President Maaouya Ould Taya. He commanded a rebel section of the Army during two days of heavy fighting in Nouakchott.  With the failure of the coup Hanenna initially escaped capture, and formed a group called the Knights of Change with Mohamed Ould Cheikhna, but they were arrested on October 9, 2004.

General Mohamed Ould Abdel Aziz, a career soldier and high-ranking officer, was a leading figure in the 2005 Mauritanian coup d'état that deposed President Maaouya Ould Sid'Ahmed Taya. In August 2008 General Ould Abdel Aziz led the 2008 Mauritanian coup d'état that toppled President Sidi Ould Cheikh Abdallahi. Following the latter coup, Abdel Aziz became President of the High Council of State as part of what was described as a political transition leading to a new election. He resigned from that post in April 2009 in order to stand as a candidate in the July 2009 presidential election, which he won. He was sworn in on 5 August 2009.

Army 

In March 1985, the Defense Intelligence Agency reported the army was 8,300 strong with no reserves (Military Intelligence Summary - Africa South of the Sahara, DDB 2680-104-85, ICOD 15 October 1984, Mauritania pages 4, 5, declassified by letter dated April 29, 2014). Reported regions at the time were Region I - Nouadbihou, Region II - Zouirat, Region III - Atar, Region IV - formerly at Tidjikdja, which no longer existed, Region V - Nema, Region VI - Nouakchott, and Region VII - Rosso. The army was organised into the six regions which each supervised several companies, though there was 'one small autonomous infantry battalion stationed in Nouakchott.'

The Army is 15,000 strong, according to the IISS, with six military regions, two camel corps battalions, one battalion of T-54/55 battle tanks, one armoured reconnaissance squadron, eight garrison infantry battalions, seven motorised infantry battalions, one commando/para battalion, 3 artillery battalions, 4 air defence batteries, one engineer company, and one guard battalion. The 1ère région militaire is at Nouadhibou, 2nd Military Region is at Zouerate, 3rd Military Region is at Atar, 4ème région militaire may be at Tidjikdja, 5th Military Region headquarters is at Néma, The 6th Military Region may be in the area of the capital, and the 7th Military Region may be at Aleg.

The Mauritanian military is currently involved in Operation Enduring Freedom - Trans Sahara. Previous U.S. anti-terrorist engagement included training under the Pan Sahel Initiative. Under the PSI, a 10th Special Forces Group training team carried out a one-week border monitoring training programme in January 2004.

The IISS listed equipment in 2007 as including 35 T-54/55 main battle tanks, 70 reconnaissance vehicles (20 Panhard AML-60, 40 Panhard AML-90, 10 Alvis Saladin) 25 wheeled APCs (estimate 20 Panhard M3 and 5 Alvis Saracen), 194 artillery pieces (80 towed: 36 HM-2/M-101, 20 D-30, 24 D-74; 114 mortars (60 60-mm, 30 Brandt 120-mm), 24 MILAN ATGM, 114 recoilless rocket launchers (est. 90 M-40A1 106mm, est 24 M-20 75mm), est 48 RPG-7 Knout, 104 SAMs (est 100 SA-7 Grail, and a reported 4 SA-9 Gaskin), and 82 towed anti-aircraft guns (14.5mm, including 12 ZPU-4, ZU-23-2, 37 mm automatic air defense gun M1939 (61-K), 12 57 mm AZP S-60, and 12 100mm KS-19s.

Weapons

Small arms

Among reported special forces units are:
1er Bataillon de Commandos Parachutistes (1er BCP)
2eme Bataillon de Commandos Parachutistes (2eme BCP)
Bataillon de la Securite Presidentielle (BASEP)
Bataillon Special d'Intervention(BSI)
 (GSI)

Air Force 

After achieving independence in 1960 the Faidem's (Force Aerienne Islamique de Mauritanie) was supplied equipment by France, such as C-47s and MH.1521 Broussards, which was later replaced by the Britten-Norman BN-2A Defender between 1976 and 1978 and had operated as a transport and observation squadron in the Western Sahara War. During the same time two Cessna 337s and two DHC-5 Buffalo STOL transports were supplied in 1977 and 1978 with one DHC-5 crashing almost immediately and the other being returned to De Havilland Canada in 1979. After the Polisario Front shot down one Defender and damaged two in 1978 the Mauritanian government ordered six IA-58 Pucarás for ground attack duties from Argentina; this order was later cancelled after a Mauritanian military coup.

The Air Force School was created in Atar. It was founded to train pilots, mechanics, other crewmen for the Air Force.

More recent procurements have been from China in the form of the Harbin Y-12 II turboprop transports were delivered in September 1995, one crashed in April 1996.  A second one crashed on July 12, 2012. The Xian Y7-100C (a copy of the AN-24 transport) was delivered from October 1997, which crashed in May 1998. The Air Force has recently received their order of Embraers.

Aircraft

Navy
Mauritania has developed a five-year plan to develop its navy into a force that is capable of defending the country's 235,000 km squared exclusive economic zone, Admiral Isselkou Ould Cheik el-Weli said during a promotion ceremony held at the Nouadhibou naval base in late May. The Saharamedias.net website reported that the plan includes the acquisition of two 60-meter vessels, which are currently under construction, and "mid-sized ships", as well as the formation of three companies of marines. No further details were provided.

By 1972 the navy had one small patrol gunboat and two small patrol craft that performed port control and customs duties. In 1987 the navy had thirteen boats. Of these boats, only eight were seaworthy, and the navy could send only two vessels out to open water at a time. Mauritania's exclusive economic zone (EEZ) extended  out from the coast, but even if effective coastal surveillance were possible, the navy's vessels would not be able to control Mauritania's waters. Nouadhibou housed the major naval base; Nouakchott housed a secondary base.

Ship inventory

References

External links
 Mauritanian National Army's Official Website
 :ar:%D8%A7%D9%84%D8%AC%D9%8A%D8%B4 %D8%A7%D9%84%D9%88%D8%B7%D9%86%D9%8A %D8%A7%D9%84%D9%85%D9%88%D8%B1%D9%8A%D8%AA%D8%A7%D9%86%D9%8A
 Arcticle in French

Military of Mauritania